Faker Holic: YMO World Tour Live is a live album by Yellow Magic Orchestra. The material on this live album was recorded during various concerts in 1979, and was released as a double CD in 1991. Several songs appeared on the 1979 live album Public Pressure, with Kazumi Watanabe's guitar parts overdubbed with keyboards and Yukihiro Takahashi's vocals replaced with those re-recorded later in studio. This album restores Watanabe's guitar parts (but not Takahashi's vocals). "Kang Tong Boy" is a song by Akiko Yano, who performed additional keyboards and backing vocals on this tour.

Track listing

Yellow Magic Orchestra albums
Alfa Records live albums
1991 live albums